Daniel Wagner (born 11 February 1987) is a German footballer who plays for TSV Plattenhardt.

External links

1987 births
Living people
German footballers
VfR Aalen players
Stuttgarter Kickers players
3. Liga players
Association football goalkeepers
Footballers from Nuremberg